Eva Theresa Bradshaw  (1871–1938) was a Canadian painter known for her floral paintings.

Biography
Bradshaw was born in 1871 in London, Ontario. 

She studied art in Canada under John and James Griffiths, and with her mentor Florence Carlyle. She also studied in the United States; in Boston, Philadelphia, and New York. In New York she studied under Robert Henri.

Bradshaw exhibited regularly with the Royal Canadian Academy of Arts from 1902 through 1907. Her paintings were exhibited in the Canadian art section at the 1923 British Empire Exhibition at Wembley, England.

She was a member of the Western Art League for over three decades, serving as treasurer for many years.

Bradshaw died in 1938.

Legacy
In 1941 the London Art Gallery held a retrospective of Bradshaw's work. More than a dozen of her paintings are part of the Museum London  collection.

Gallery

References

External links
 
 images of Bradshaw's paintings on ArtNet

1871 births 
1938 deaths
19th-century Canadian painters
19th-century Canadian women artists
20th-century Canadian painters
20th-century Canadian women artists
Artists from London, Ontario
Canadian women painters